Roman Vajs (born 18 November 1974 in Liptovský Mikuláš) is a Slovak slalom canoeist who competed at the international level from 1990 to 2004.

Vajs won two medals in the C2 team event at the ICF Canoe Slalom World Championships with a silver in 1999 and a bronze in 1993. He won the overall World Cup title in the C2 class in 1998. He also won 3 medals at the European Championships (1 gold, 1 silver and 1 bronze).

Vajs finished 13th in the C2 event at the 1996 Summer Olympics in Atlanta.

His partner in the C2 boat until 2000 was Roman Štrba, who was paralyzed in an accident in March 2001. In the years after Štrba's accident, Vajs teamed up with Pavol Hric who had competed in K1 until then.

World Cup individual podiums

References

1975 births
Canoeists at the 1996 Summer Olympics
Living people
Olympic canoeists of Slovakia
Slovak male canoeists
Sportspeople from Liptovský Mikuláš
Medalists at the ICF Canoe Slalom World Championships